Ava Smith is an American fashion model.

Early life 
Smith was born in Chicago. She has three siblings.

Career 
Smith was introduced to Elite Model Management's Chicago branch by a family friend. She appeared in a British Vogue editorial, a Russian Vogue editorial, a United Colors of Benetton advertisement, a Nordstrom advertisement, and walked for DKNY, Helmut Lang, and Thierry Mugler. After finishing her education, she started modeling full-time in 2011. After signing with Wilhelmina Models, she walked in over 50 shows including Calvin Klein, Gucci, Dolce & Gabbana, Givenchy, YSL, Missoni, Isabel Marant, Rochas, and Chanel.

Smith was once ranked as a "Money Girl" by models.com

In 2014, she appeared in an ensemble campaign for Tommy Hilfiger, along with models such as Marlon Teixeira, Maud Welzen, Cora Emmanuel, and RJ King.

References 

Living people
1988 births
American female models
People from Chicago
Models from Chicago
The Lions (agency) models
21st-century American women